Dustin "Dusty" Rhodes (born in Oklahoma), is an American author.

In his childhood, Rhodes commonly read Western novels. After retirement, he began writing new stories based on those old books from memory. His first book Man Hunter was named The Best Western E-book of 2002.

Biography
Dusty Rhodes was born in a former Indian Reservation in Eastern Oklahoma, within horseback distance of Fort Smith, Arkansas. Some of the trails he rode were shared by the James-Younger Gang, Dalton Gang and Belle Starr, which eventually influenced his writing.

Rhodes wrote hundreds of poems, songs, and short stories during his career, composing his first novel in 1999.

Works 

 Man Hunter
 Shiloh
 Jedidiah Boone
 Shooter
 Death Rides a Pale Horse
 Vengeance Is Mine
 Longhorn Book I
 Longhorn Book II
 Longhorn Book III
 Longhorn Book IV
 Shawgo-Texas Ranger
 Chero
 The Town Tamer

References 

 Man Hunter by Dusty Rhodes - EPPIE 2002 Winner

External links
Dusty Rhodes Books

Living people
Year of birth missing (living people)
American male writers